US Post Office-Watkins Glen is a historic post office building located at Watkins Glen in Schuyler County, New York.  It was designed and built in 1934-1935 and is one of a number of post offices in New York State designed by the Office of the Supervising Architect of the Treasury Department, Louis A. Simon. It is a small, one story, five bay steel frame, red brick clad building executed in the Colonial Revival style.

It was listed on the National Register of Historic Places in 1989.

References

Watkins Glen
Colonial Revival architecture in New York (state)
Government buildings completed in 1935
Buildings and structures in Schuyler County, New York
National Register of Historic Places in Schuyler County, New York
1935 establishments in New York (state)